Micah Gunnell (born June 18, 1980) is an animation director, storyboard artist, and comic book artist who currently works for Dreamworks Animation in the United States. In addition to his work in comics, he has produced storyboards for several animated series, including Film Roman/Marvel's Ultimate Spider-Man, Nickelodeon's Teenage Mutant Ninja Turtles, Marvel's Guardians of the Galaxy, and Avengers Assemble. He has also directed on Marvel's Avengers animated series, and is currently a director on DreamWorks' Fast and Furious: Spy Racers series which is available on Netflix.

Bibliography
Executive Assistant: ORCHID miniseries
Dellec vol. 1
Aspen Showcase: Benoist
Shrugged #0-8
Shrugged: Beginnings #1
Soulfire: Dying of the Light #0-5
Aspen Seasons Spring 2005
Deadpool Team-Up#890

External links

Interview at Comic News

1980 births
Living people
American comics artists
The Kubert School alumni
American storyboard artists
American animated film directors
American television directors